Yoshitaka Nishimura (西村宜隆) (born February 9, 1979, Kyushu), better known as DJ Yoshitaka, is a composer for Konami's line of Bemani games. He has been making solo songs since the release of Beatmania IIDX 11: IIDX Red, though he has had previous Bemani involvement as a member of Osamu Migitera's Des-ROW group. He often composes for the Beatmania IIDX and the Pop'n music series, and then began composing for the Guitar Freaks & DrumMania and the Dance Dance Revolution series in 2005 and 2007, respectively. DJ Yoshitaka still often works with Des-ROW for some Pop'n music songs. In the Reflec Beat series, DJ Yoshitaka regularly appears alongside fellow composer Sota Fujimori as a double act, Venus.

DJ Yoshitaka's Bemani Music Foundation artist page states that he likes taking trips, fine days, cappuccino, Shibuya, motorbikes, vegetable pancakes and people who are kind. It says that he dislikes rainy seasons and people who are cold.

Along with dj Taka, L.E.D., Sota Fujimori, Ryu☆, kors k, and 猫叉Master, DJ Yoshitaka is part of Beatnation Records.

DJ Yoshitaka has been one of the sound producers for Beatmania IIDX since the release of Beatmania IIDX 11: IIDX Red. He became the sound director of the Reflect Beat series since 2010. In 2013, he became the producer of Sound Voltex II -infinite infection-, a sequel to the original KONAMI game Sound Voltex Booth.

Songs

beatmania IIDX
beatmania IIDX 11 IIDX Red
D.A.N.C.E.! (with Kanako Hoshino)
Close my Eyes for Me (with D-crew and Dennis Gunn)
リグレット (with Kanako Hoshino; CS version song)
beatmania IIDX 12 Happy Sky
Catch Me (with ERi)
CaptivAte ~浄化~ (with A/I)
Endless Summer Story (with Kanako Hoshino; CS version song)
beatmania IIDX 13 DistorteD
Spring Rain (Lluvia de Primavera)
wish (with Kotomi Sugimura)
WISH (Eurobeat Mix) (with Kotomi Sugimura)
Bloody Tears (IIDX Edition) (also appears in Dance Dance Revolution SuperNova 2)
Inferno (with Tomosuke as Caldeira; vocals by Kanako Hoshino)
タシカナモノ (with dj Taka, Mr. T and Tatsh as the Band; vocals by Kanako Hoshino)
Contract (under another alias, 朱雀 [Suzaku])
quell -the seventh slave- (with dj TAKA; CS version song)
beatmania IIDX 14 Gold
CaptivAte ~誓い~ (with A/I; also appears in Dance Dance Revolution SuperNova 2)
星をこの手に (with Kanakplpo Hoshino)
Ghostbusters
Vanessa (under another alias, 朱雀 [Suzaku])
Gold Rush (as DJ Yoshitaka-G, with Michael a la mode)
Guilt & Love (with jun as The Plastic Ambition; CS version song)
beatmania IIDX 15 DJ Troopers
I'm In Love Again -DJ Yoshitaka Remix-
Max Love (with Kanako Hoshino)
Anisakis -somatic mutation type"Forza"- (under another alias, 朱雀 [Suzaku])
Mendes (under another alias, Humanoid)
Claiomh Solais (with S.S.D.; CS version song)
beatmania IIDX 16 Empress
B4U (Bemani For You Mix, with Michael a la mode)
CaptivAte2 ~覚醒~ (with e-lma)
Cyber Force -DJ Yoshitaka Remix-
I'm Screaming LOVE (with TSU-NA as Creative Life)
翼 (with Yuu Kobayashi)
卑弥呼 (under another alias, 朱雀 [Suzaku]; with wac as 玄武 [Genbu])
Colorful Cookie (under another alias, Lucky Vacuum)
Unicorn tail (CS version song)
beatmania IIDX 17 Sirius
Non-Fiction Story! (with TSU-NA as Creative Life)
Elisha (shorter version appears in Reflec Beat)
Miracle Meets (as Lucky Vacuum)
フェティッシュペイパー ~脇の汗回転ガール~ (with Akira Yamaoka as ガキ大将ティーム)
たからもの
CaptivAte ~裁き~(Sublime Techno Mix)
Almagest (with Tomosuke as Galdeira)
Evans -prototype- (used in the Normal and Hyper difficulties of the song from jubeat)
beatmania IIDX 18 Resort Anthem
Watch Out Pt.2 (with DJ Mass MAD Izm*)
Stay my side (also appears in Reflec Beat)
beatmania IIDX 19 Lincle
Snake Stick (with DJ Mass MAD Izm*)

Dance Dance Revolution
Dance Dance Revolution SuperNova 2
Girigili 門前雀羅 (Girigili Burning 24H) (with Des-ROW and mur.mur.kurotoh as Cheki-ROWS)
Vem brincar (with Tomosuke as Caldeira; vocals by Téka Penteriche)
Dance Dance Revolution Hottest Party 2
Super Hero (with Michaela Thurlow)
The Lonely Streets (with Robert "RAab" Stevenson)
Dance Dance Revolution X2
Valkyrie dimension (as Spriggan)

GuitarFreaks & DrumMania
GuitarFreaks V & DrumMania V
Endless Cruising (with Des-ROW; vocals by SHIGE)
GuitarFreaks V2 & DrumMania V2
CaptivAte ~裁き~ (with A/I; also appeared in beatmania IIDX 14 GOLD)
GuitarFreaks V3 & DrumMania V3
Day's (with Kanako Hoshino)
差無来!! (with Des-ROW)
GuitarFreaks V4 & DrumMania V4 Rock×Rock
Darling my LUV (with B-Agents; also appeared in beatmania IIDX 15 DJ TROOPERS)
GuitarFreaks V5 & DrumMania V5 Rock to Infinity
腐斯偽堕日本 (with Des-ROW)
VANESSA -転生編- (under another alias, 朱雀 [Suzaku]; with TAG)
GuitarFreaks XG & DrumMania XG
幻想花 (with Kanako Hoshino)

jubeat
jubeat
Evans (also appeared in beatmania IIDX 17 Sirius)
jubeat ripples Append
ALBIDA (also appeared in beatmania IIDX 18 Resort Anthem)
jubeat knit Append
FLOWER (also a crossover to REFLEC BEAT as part of the "Append Festival" event held in March 2011)
jubeat copious Append
Jomanda
jubeat saucer fulfill
Lisa-Riccia
jubeat Qubell
Triple Counter (with Takayuki Ishikawa)
jubeat clan
Couleur=Blanche (with Ryutaro Nakahara)

pop'n music
pop'n music 12 Iroha
MY
雪上断火 (with Des-ROW as Des-ROW・組)
pop'n music 13 Carnival
虹色 (with G.S.C license; also appeared in Dance Dance Revolution SuperNova and beatmania IIDX 13: DistorteD)
SUN/光線 (with Des-ROW as Des-ROW・組スペシアルz)
太陽とバトル (as つよし; a collaboration with Yoshihiko Koezuka, which the artist name is a wordplay of both of their names as Two-Yoshi)
ランブルメドレー (with cutie smashers)
真超深tion (with Des-ROW and Asaki as Des-あさ)
pop'n music 14 Fever!
High School Love (with DWP; also appeared in beatmania IIDX 14: Gold)
晴香-Haruka- (with Kanako Hoshino)
レトロスペクト路 (with Des-ROW as Des-ROW・組スペシアルz)
踊るフィーバーロボ
pop'n music 15 Adventure
ウィーアー!
儚きは我が決意
路男 (with Des-ROW as Des-ROW・組ユナイテッド)
pop'n music 16 Party
Love☆Ba☆zooka！ (with ななっち)
プリンシプル (with Des-ROW as Des-ROW+Y)
pop'n music 17 The Movie
Star Ship★Hero (as Lucky Vacuum)
pop'n music 18 Sengoku Retsuden
Gold RUsh (pop'n Gold Mountain rush) (as DJ Yoshitaka-G feat. Michael a la mode)
心のコラージュ (with Yoshihiko Koezuka as つよし)
三日天下モンキー
pop'n music 19 Tune Street
Shion
pop'n music 20 Fantasia
MANA
pop'n music Sunny Park
Brand New World (with Sota Fujimori as VENUS)

Reflec Beat
Reflec Beat
Choo Choo Train -Venus mix- (with Sota Fujimori as Venus)
Juicy (with kors k as Lovers DJ Yoshitaka)
イミテーション語ル死ス (with Des-ROW)
Special Summer Campaign! (as Lucky Vacuum)
Survival Games (with Sota Fujimori as Venus)
Diamond Dust -Try to Sing Ver.- (with Tag, vocal)
Seed
Reflec Beat limelight
1/3の純情な感情 (with Sota Fujimori as Venus)
limelight world (with DWP)
ビューティフル レシート (as Lucky Vacuum)
Far Away (with Sota Fujimori as Venus)
威風堂々 -チュートリアルより- (as Rb. Conductor)
Vallis-Neria
Reflec Beat Colette
Chu☆Chu☆Tonight (with Sota Fujimori as Venus)
Cosmic Hurricane -Try to Sing Ver.- (with Tag)
Daily Lunch Special (as Lucky Vacuum)
Freedom (with Sota Fujimori as Venus)
Survival Games - Zeus Mix- (with Sota Fujimori as Venus)
Unlimited Fire - Try to Sing Ver.- (with Tag, vocal)
Wow Wow Venus (with Sota Fujimori as Venus)
三日月 (with Sota Fujimori as Venus)

Bemani Events
Elemental Creation (with dj Taka, private Benami Academy, remixed in GitaDora as Elemental Creation (-Gitado Rock ver.))

Other Works
rainbow flyer (DJ Yoshitaka Remix) (found in beatmania IIDX 8th style - V-RARE 8)
I'm In Love Again - DJ Yoshitaka Remix - (found in dj TakaA's album "milestone")
CaptivAte ~裁き~(Sublime Techno Mix, performed in the beatnation summit ~beatmania IIDX premium Live~)
Photongenic - DJ YOSHITAKA Remix- (found in L.E.D.'s album "電人K")
Cyber Force - DJ Yoshitaka Remix- (found in Sota Fujimori's album "Synthesized")
Is This Love?(This is LOVE mix) (found in Keiichi Ueno's album "Rewind!")
Second Heaven -Samba, Samba, SomeBody Mix- (found in Ryu☆'s album "starmine")
Juicy (with kors k as Lovers DJ Yoshitaka, found in kors k's album "Ways For Liberation")

External links
DJ YOSHITAKA's official blog
beatnation Records official site

References

1982 births
Japanese composers
Japanese male composers
Living people
Musicians from Nagasaki Prefecture
Video game composers